The final of the Men's hammer throw event at the 1982 European Championships in Athens, Greece was held on September 10, 1982. The qualification round was staged a day earlier, on September 9, 1982.

Medalists

Records

Qualification
Q = automatic qualification; q = qualified by rank; DNS = did not start; NM = no mark; WR = world record; CR = championship record; AR = area record; NR = national record; PB = personal best; SB = season best

Final ranking

Final

Participation
According to an unofficial count, 21 athletes from 12 countries participated in the event.

 (1)
 (2)
 (3)
 (1)
 (1)
 (2)
 (1)
 (2)
 (3)
 (1)
 (1)
 (3)

See also
 1980 Men's Olympic Hammer Throw (Moscow)
 1982 Hammer Throw Year Ranking
 1983 Men's World Championships Hammer Throw (Helsinki)
 1984 Men's Olympic Hammer Throw (Los Angeles)
 1987 Men's World Championships Hammer Throw (Rome)
 1988 Men's Olympic Hammer Throw (Seoul)

References

 Results
 hammerthrow.wz

Hammer throw
Hammer throw at the European Athletics Championships